Doetinchem De Huet is a railway station located in western Doetinchem, Netherlands. The station lies between the quarters De Huet and Dichteren. The station was opened on 2 June 1985 as a replacement for the previous station Doetinchem West (earlier: Doetinchem-Wijnbergen (1885-1965)), which was open from 1885 to 1985. It's located on the Winterswijk–Zevenaar railway. Train services are operated by Arriva and Breng. In a Railpro survey in 2005 there were approximately 1,232 passengers per day using Doetinchem De Huet station.

Train services

Bus services

References

External links
NS website 
Dutch Public Transport journey planner 

Railway stations in Doetinchem
Railway stations opened in 1985
1985 establishments in the Netherlands
Railway stations in the Netherlands opened in the 20th century